Noodles are a type of food.

Noodle or Noodles may also refer to:

Places
 Noodle, Texas, a community in the United States

People
Noodles (musician), Kevin John Wasserman, (born 1963) an American guitarist and member of the band Offspring
 Noodles, Masta Killa, (born 1969), a member of the musical group Wu-Tang Clan
 Noodles, Jamie McLennan, (born 1971), a Canadian sportscaster & former goaltender in the National Hockey League
 Noodles Hahn (Frank George Hahn, 1879–1960), American Major League Baseball player

Arts, entertainment, and media

Fictional characters
 David "Noodles" Aaronson, the protagonist of 1952 novel Once Upon A Time In America
 Noodle (Gorillaz), a fictional member of the band Gorillaz
 Mr. Noodle, human character on Sesame Street
 Noodles (Usagi Yojimbo), a character in the comic books series Usagi Yojimbo

Other arts, entertainment, and media
 Noodle (film), a 2007 Israeli film
 Noodles (band), a Japanese rock music group

Other uses 
 Noodle, a guide for the cable on a bicycle brake
 Egg noodle, a form of pasta
 Noodles & Company, an American fast food restaurant chain
 Pool noodle, a piece of foam used while swimming
 Noodle, an education technology company founded by John Katzman
 Noodling, musical improvisation, often used in a pejorative sense
 Noodle (dog), a pet influencer popular for TikTok videos

See also
 Noodling, fishing for catfish with bare hands
 Searching for opals in mine detritus; see 
 Noddle (disambiguation)